Annals of Plastic Surgery is a monthly peer-reviewed medical journal covering all aspects of plastic and reconstructive surgery. It is published by Lippincott Williams & Wilkins and the editor-in-chief is William C. Lineaweaver (Joseph M. Still Burn and Reconstructive Center, Brandon, Mississippi, United States).

Abstracting and indexing
The journal is abstracted and indexed in CAB Abstracts,  Current Contents/Clinical Medicine, Embase, Index Medicus/MEDLINE/PubMed, Science Citation Index Expanded, and Scopus. According to the Journal Citation Reports, the journal has a 2018 impact factor of 1.448.

See also

List of medical journals

References

External links

1978 establishments in the United States
English-language journals
Hybrid open access journals
Lippincott Williams & Wilkins academic journals
Monthly journals
Plastic surgery
Publications established in 1978
Surgery journals